Dichotomius is a genus of Scarabaeidae or scarab beetles in the superfamily Scarabaeoidea.

Species 
 Dichotomius acuticornis
 Dichotomius adrastus
 Dichotomius affinis
 Dichotomius agenor
 Dichotomius agesilaus
 Dichotomius alutaceus
 Dichotomius alyattes
 Dichotomius amicitiae
 Dichotomius amplicollis
 Dichotomius annae
 Dichotomius anthrax
 Dichotomius apicalis
 Dichotomius ascanius
 Dichotomius assifer
 Dichotomius batesi
 Dichotomius bechynei
 Dichotomius belus
 Dichotomius bicornis
 Dichotomius bicuspis
 Dichotomius bitiensis
 Dichotomius boreus
 Dichotomius borgmeieri
 Dichotomius bos
 Dichotomius bosqui
 Dichotomius bucki
 Dichotomius buqueti
 Dichotomius calcaratus
 Dichotomius camargoi
 Dichotomius camposeabrai
 Dichotomius carbonarius
 Dichotomius carinatus
 Dichotomius carolinus
 Dichotomius centralis
 Dichotomius coenosus
 Dichotomius colonicus
 Dichotomius comarapensis
 Dichotomius conicollis
 Dichotomius costaricensis
 Dichotomius cotopaxi
 Dichotomius crinicollis
 Dichotomius cuprinus
 Dichotomius dahli
 Dichotomius danieli
 Dichotomius depressicollis
 Dichotomius deyrollei
 Dichotomius diabolicus
 Dichotomius dynastus
 Dichotomius enrietti
 Dichotomius eucranioides
 Dichotomius fallax
 Dichotomius favi
 Dichotomius femoratus
 Dichotomius fimbriatus
 Dichotomius fissiceps
 Dichotomius fissus
 Dichotomius fonsecae
 Dichotomius fortestriatus
 Dichotomius gamboaensis
 Dichotomius geminatus
 Dichotomius glaucus
 Dichotomius globulus
 Dichotomius guaranii
 Dichotomius haroldi
 Dichotomius hempeli
 Dichotomius horridus
 Dichotomius horvathi
 Dichotomius imitator
 Dichotomius inachoides
 Dichotomius inachus
 Dichotomius inflaticollis
 Dichotomius ingens
 Dichotomius interstitialis
 Dichotomius irinus
 Dichotomius joelus
 Dichotomius laevicollis
 Dichotomius latistriatus
 Dichotomius longiceps
 Dichotomius lucasi
 Dichotomius luctuosioides
 Dichotomius luctuosus
 Dichotomius lycas
 Dichotomius machadoi
 Dichotomius mamillatus
 Dichotomius maya
 Dichotomius melzeri
 Dichotomius micans
 Dichotomius missionus
 Dichotomius monstrosus
 Dichotomius mormon
 Dichotomius motai
 Dichotomius mundus
 Dichotomius muticus
 Dichotomius mysticus
 Dichotomius nemoricola
 Dichotomius nevermanni
 Dichotomius nimuendaju
 Dichotomius nisus
 Dichotomius nitidissimus
 Dichotomius nobilis
 Dichotomius nutans
 Dichotomius ocellatopunctatus
 Dichotomius ohausi
 Dichotomius opacipennis
 Dichotomius opalescens
 Dichotomius paraguayanus
 Dichotomius parcepunctatus
 Dichotomius pauloensis
 Dichotomius planicollis
 Dichotomius podalirius
 Dichotomius prietoi
 Dichotomius problematicus
 Dichotomius protectus
 Dichotomius provisorius
 Dichotomius punctatostriatus
 Dichotomius puncticollis
 Dichotomius punctulatipennis
 Dichotomius pygidialis
 Dichotomius quadraticeps
 Dichotomius quadrinodosus
 Dichotomius quinquedens
 Dichotomius quinquelobatus
 Dichotomius reclinatus
 Dichotomius ribeiroi
 Dichotomius robustus
 Dichotomius rodrigoi
 Dichotomius rotundatus
 Dichotomius rotundigena
 Dichotomius rugatus
 Dichotomius rugosicollis
 Dichotomius rugosipennis
 Dichotomius sagittarius
 Dichotomius satanas
 Dichotomius schiffleri
 Dichotomius semiaeneus
 Dichotomius semisquamosus
 Dichotomius sericeus
 Dichotomius sexdentatus
 Dichotomius simplex
 Dichotomius simplicicornis
 Dichotomius simulans
 Dichotomius singularis
 Dichotomius smaragdinus
 Dichotomius spadiceus
 Dichotomius speciosus
 Dichotomius subaeneus
 Dichotomius superbus
 Dichotomius telamon
 Dichotomius texanus
 Dichotomius triangulariceps
 Dichotomius triquetrus
 Dichotomius tristis
 Dichotomius validipilosus
Dichotomius vidaurrei 
 Dichotomius virescens
 Dichotomius worontzowi
 Dichotomius yucatanus
 Dichotomius zikani

References

Scarabaeidae